X-23 is a 2018 comic book series published by Marvel Comics. It is the fourth volume entitled X-23.

Publication history
In June 2015, it was announced that following that year's "Secret Wars" storyline, Laura would take on the Wolverine mantle, as the main character in the series All-New Wolverine, by writer Tom Taylor and artist David López, and wearing a costume resembling Wolverine's but with the return of the original Wolverine her title was ended and a new volume was launched under X-23 written by Mariko Tamaki and drawn by Juann Cabal. Tamaki said, "This is a story about being in the very weird kind of family that someone like Laura finds herself in. It’s about what it means to wrestle with legacy and identity when you were created to be a weapon and not someone with a birthday and a sister." The series ran for 12 issues before being folded into the new Dawn of X reboot by Jonathan Hickman.

Plot
Laura Kinney gives up the Wolverine mantle and returns to her X-23 code name "X-23", then she, her little sister Gabby and pet Jonathan continue to fight as superheroes and balance their lives. While adjusting to being a part of each other's lives, the two must also with another new clone, which happens to be a cyborg and an X Assassin.

Collected issues
The entire fourth volume has been collected into the two following paperbacks.

Reception
The series currently holds an 8.1 out of 10 from 93 professional critics on the comic book review aggregator Comic Book Roundup.

See also 
 List of X-Men comics

References

External links
 

2018 comics debuts
X-23 titles